James McGovern may refer to:

 James F. McGovern (born 1946), United States Under Secretary of the Air Force, 1986–1989
 James F. McGovern (coach) (1893–1976), American college football and basketball player and coach
 James J. McGovern, president of A.T. Still University
 James B. McGovern Jr. (1922–1954), World War II fighter pilot and aviator with the Central Intelligence Agency
 Jim McGovern (American politician) (born 1959), member of the United States House of Representatives from Massachusetts, 1997–present
 Jim McGovern (golfer) (born 1965), American PGA Tour player
 Jim McGovern (British politician) (born 1956), Member of the United Kingdom Parliament, 2005–2015
 Jimmy McGovern (born 1949), English television scriptwriter